Jack William Burkett (born 21 August 1942) is an English former professional footballer who played as a full-back in the Football League for West Ham United and Charlton Athletic, and was player-manager at League of Ireland team St Patrick's Athletic.

Career
Burkett started his career at West Ham United, joining the senior team in July 1958. He played in the FA Youth Cup Final of 1958–59 alongside Bobby Moore, Harry Cripps and Eddie Bovington, and made his League debut against Fulham on 30 April 1962. Burkett made 142 League appearances for West Ham, scoring four goals. He also made 39 cup appearances, and was a member of the FA Cup winning side of 1964. He was also a member of the European Cup Winners' Cup winning team of 1965.

Burkett lost his place in the West Ham team to John Charles after an injury during the 1966–67 season, and moved to Charlton Athletic for £10,000 on 12 June 1968. He later played for Millwall and Southend United although he never featured in the League for either team.

Burkett signed as player-manager at League of Ireland team St Patrick's Athletic in August 1971. In four seasons Burkett guided Pats to an FAI Cup Final in 1974 and several high place finishes. However, he was let go in April 1975.

Burkett returned to Southend United as player-coach. He went on to manage the Saudi Arabia under-18 team, then Ørsta of the Norwegian Third Division in 1980, before returning again to Southend as youth coach. He later took the role of youth coach at Fulham. He later worked for the Professional Footballers' Association, where he worked with young professionals such as Rio Ferdinand, John Terry, Frank Lampard, Michael Carrick and Joe Cole.

Honours
West Ham United
 FA Cup: 1963–64
 FA Charity Shield: 1964 (shared)
European Cup Winners' Cup: 1964–65

St Patrick's Athletic
 LFA Presidents Cup: 1971–72

References

1942 births
Living people
Footballers from Edmonton, London
English footballers
Association football fullbacks
FA Cup Final players
English Football League players
League of Ireland players
West Ham United F.C. players
Charlton Athletic F.C. players
Millwall F.C. players
Southend United F.C. players
St Patrick's Athletic F.C. players
English football managers
Association football coaches
League of Ireland managers
St Patrick's Athletic F.C. managers
Fulham F.C. non-playing staff
Southend United F.C. non-playing staff
English expatriate footballers
English expatriate football managers
English expatriate sportspeople in Ireland
Expatriate association footballers in the Republic of Ireland
English expatriate sportspeople in Saudi Arabia
Expatriate football managers in Saudi Arabia
English expatriate sportspeople in Norway
Expatriate football managers in Norway